The Federal Telecommunications Institute (Spanish: Instituto Federal de Telecomunicaciones; abbreviated as IFT and incorrectly referred to as IFETEL) is an independent government agency of Mexico charged with the regulation of telecommunications and broadcasting services. It was formed on September 10, 2013, as part of larger reforms to Mexican telecom regulations, and replaced the Federal Telecommunications Commission (Cofetel).

The current President of the IFT is Gabriel Oswaldo Contreras Saldívar.

History
On August 8, 1996, President Ernesto Zedillo created Cofetel, which originally was based in the tower of the Secretariat of Communications and Transportation.

In 2013, President Enrique Peña Nieto created the IFT to replace Cofetel as part of the telecommunications reform package of the Pacto por México. The IFT is an autonomous federal agency that is responsible for the regulation of the use of spectrum, telecommunications and broadcasting networks and offerings, and access to infrastructure. IFT also regulates the awarding of concessions and permits for broadcast stations and promotes and protects competition in telecommunications.

Through an agreement with PROFECO, the IFT also handles user comments and complaints for communications services.

Organization 
The IFT is headed by a board of seven commissioners, including a Chair. They are each nominated by the President and confirmed by the Senate.

The sitting commissioners are:
 Gabriel Oswaldo Contreras Saldívar (Chairman)
 Mario Germán Fromow Rangel
 Adolfo Cuevas Teja
 Arturo Robles Rovalo
 Javier Juárez Mojica
 Sóstenes Díaz González
 Ramiro Camacho Castillo

References

External links

2013 establishments in Mexico
Executive branch of the government of Mexico
Telecommunications in Mexico
Telecommunications law